Ruben Zimmermann (born May 10, 1968) is a German Theologian, New Testament Scholar and Ethicist, currently Professor at the Johannes Gutenberg University of Mainz, Germany.

Biography and education 
Zimmerman received his PhD at the Ruprecht-Karls-University Heidelberg in 1999, and his Habilitation at the Ludwig-Maximilians University of Munich in 2003. From 2005–2009, he was Professor for Biblical Studies at Bielefeld University; since then he is  Professor for New Testament and Ethics at the Johannes Gutenberg-University of Mainz.

He is Co-leader of the Mainz Research Center for Ethics in Antiquity and Christianity (e/ac), and he has been elected as one of 15 advanced career scholars in the Templeton "Enhancing Life Project".

Work – Research fields 
His areas of research are in ethics (ethical theory, biblical ethics, applied ethics)  the Gospel of John, the parables of Jesus, and miracle stories. Challenging scholarly consensus Zimmermann identifies also parables in the Gospel of John, such as the parable of the good shepherd (John 10:1-5) or the dying grain (John 12:24).

Books

As author 
 
 
 
 
 English translation: Logic of Love: Discovering Paul's "implicit Ethics" Through 1 Corinthians, Lexington/Fortress Academic, 2018
see the review

As editor 
 
 
 
 
 
 
 
 
 
 
 
 
 
 
 
 Faszination der Wunder Jesu und der Apostel. Die Debatte um die frühchristlichen Wundererzählungen geht weiter (BThS 184), Göttingen: Vandenhoeck & Ruprecht 2020. siehe Verlagsseite

Notes

References

External links 
Full chronological list of publications
Mainz Research Center for Ethics in Antiquity and Christianity
Prof. Dr. Ruben Zimmermann | Evangelisch-Theologische Fakultät
YouTube (introductory paper to the longevity conference Mainz, 20 July 2016)

21st-century German theologians
1968 births
Living people
Academic staff of Johannes Gutenberg University Mainz
Heidelberg University alumni
Ludwig Maximilian University of Munich alumni